West Craft Records was a Los Angeles-based jazz record label of the early 1950s. Musicians who recorded on West Craft included Jack Teagarden and Pud Brown.

See also
 List of record labels

Defunct record labels of the United States
Jazz record labels